Arthur Kay or Kaye may refer to:

Arthur Kay (rugby league), New Zealand rugby player
Arthur Kaye (1933–2003), English footballer
Sir Arthur Kaye, 3rd Baronet (c. 1670–1726), English politician
Arthur Kay (musician) (1882–1969), American composer for films

See also
Arthur Kaye Legge (1766–1835), British Royal Navy officer
Kay Arthur (born 1933), Bible teacher and author